Zigzag Mountain is a volcanic mountain in Clackamas County in the U.S. state of Oregon.
Because of its proximity to Mount Hood, it is considered a foothill.

The mountain is capped by Pliocene andesite and basalt.

The "Zigzag" name used was apparently derived from Oregon pioneer Joel Palmer's description of the zigzagging route he used to descend from Mount Hood's Zigzag Canyon (in which Zigzag Glacier is located) and on down what is now Zigzag Mountain.

References 

Mountains of Oregon
Mount Hood
Volcanoes of Clackamas County, Oregon
Mountains of Clackamas County, Oregon
Volcanoes of Oregon